Federalist No. 8 is an essay by Alexander Hamilton, the eighth of The Federalist Papers. It was published on November 20, 1787 under the pseudonym Publius, the name under which all The Federalist papers were published. In it, Hamilton argues for the utility of the Union to the well-being of Americans, specifically addressing the negative consequences if the Union were to collapse and conflict arise between the states. It is titled "Consequences of Hostilities Between the States".

Essay Synopsis
If the states do not unify into a single nation there will be a perpetual cycle of conflict between neighboring states.  Their alliances or dis-unions create circumstances similar to European nations, where the cycle of aggression between neighboring nations creates the need for domestic armies and fortifications.  Additionally, if not unified populous states, motivated by greed might plunder weaker states for their resources.

The motivation for a union is safety, being aware though that no matter how great the nation's commitment to liberty freedoms are compromised in order to achieve protection.  The physical damage of armed conflict compels nations to implement a military deterrent and in doing so an overly militaristic culture diminishes the civil and political rights of the people.  "To be more safe, they at length become willing to run the risk of being less free."

The new Constitution does not prohibit standing armies and it is inferred that a perpetual army will exist.  The frequency of conflict and the need for defense will necessitate a ready armed force for defense.  And by its nature a militaristic state strengthens the executive arm (from which a monarchy could emerge).  War increases executive authority at the expense of the other branches of government.

Extreme defense would likely give rise to oppressive government practices.

Observing history; the livelihood of citizens cause the population to be ill suited for war.  A varied workforce necessitates the development of a profession of soldiers who would be distinct from the body of the citizens.

"The military state becomes elevated above the civil."  Nations that don't have a full-time army are less likely to oppress citizens.  The leaders of nations prone to invasion must maintain defensive forces, however frequently this militarism infringes upon the citizen's rights or weakens their sense of entitlement of those rights; the continental nations of Western Europe were examples of this.

Also, a Union of states would act as a deterrent from aggression by nearby Foreign colonies.

Background
The creation of the 8th federalist paper, written by Alexander Hamilton, was to establish a proper Union and the importance of protecting one. Without a Union, or unity between states, the United States would've had little to no defensive protocols against foreign invaders. Given the United States was underdeveloped, at the time, in comparison to Great Britain, in no way would have America protected itself against attackers of outer parties. The main conflict was that if the states can't work together to work in harmony, how can they work together to protect each other? Hence the creation of a standing army was underway. However, the thoughts of having a professional army created doubts among the people, that they can't be completely trusted. Meaning, that if an army were to be established, they would have a great deal of power. The issue here is that the militants may misuse the given power for their own advantage. Under false pretenses of protection, militants may deceive the same people they swore to protect by stealing from them. Promising the people protection for something in return.

Regardless of the negativities, an army was required nonetheless. With proper training and equipment, the soldiers were ready to take on anything thrown at them. Apart from an army, the government was another form of power. Immeasurable capabilities within its grasp only proved the very strength it contained. If the central powers were to be distributed among the various states, there's the possibility that it didn't spread equally. This results in one state having more power than the other(s). Misusing the newfound authority may create conflicts between the states leading to rivalries. If these international affairs aren't managed properly, the probability of the States working in unison is negligible. In other words, if the states are too busy with fighting each other, how will they protect each other?

Publication
In terms of protection against invaders, Federalist 8 shares a strong bond with Federalist 29, Concerning the Militia. Federalist 8 states why a union should exist and why it should be protected, while Federalist 29 mentions the existence of a militia.  The connection is that a union should be guarded, and the creation of a militia will ensure the preservation of a union. Since a militia is composed entirely of civilians, it would be prepared to battle anything and anyone that dared to harm the people or their homes.  Federalist 29 states that having a militia is much better than having a standing army. This may contradict earlier statements as to why one would be great, but the positive side of not having a standing army is that there is no possible threat to the people's freedom, meaning the government has the ability to control an army and the power may be misused to silence the people and in the worst case, create a dictatorship. Hence, a militia was preferable and if the United States were to be attacked, a militia would be available immediately.

Four years after Federalist 8 was published, the bill to pass the Second Amendment was a success. This event only improved the benefits mentioned in Federalist 8, as it mentions to secure and protect a Union. The Second Amendment states that the people's right to bear arms will not be "infringed." Meaning that, a citizen will not be punished if he or she raises a weapon against an individual who meant harm. This relates to Federalist 8, in the sense that if a group of individuals from outer interest decided to harm the U.S., we the people have the right to raise our weapons against them without facing any prosecution.

As mentioned before, Great Britain possessed great power given that it was greatly developed in terms of government, democracy, and overall structure. Their defenses were near impenetrable. If the United States hadn't created a Union, Great Britain could have taken over the States with such ease. The existence of an army was crucial at the time since it was the United States secondary form of security against intruders. Since Great Britain's army was ahead of its time, they also established the Royal Navy sometime afterwards. That army controlled the seas, so if the United States were to attack Britain for whatever reason, their army would be destroyed before they even reach the shores to plan their next attack. So America's best bet was to remain where they were and focus on the defensive as if they were to attack, they'd instantly face a major loss.

Hamilton's finishing statement in Federalist 8 stated that if we were to protect the Union, we'd face years of enjoyment and live stress free as long as States work in harmony to guard each other. Taking the World Wars into perspective demonstrates the extent to which the Federalist Paper reaches to. Words spoken have never been truer, and it's proven beyond the World Wars to the current generation. The global war on terrorism is a great example of how states or countries must work together to get rid of a common threat. Once they've understood the problem, the only solution will be determined in the form of teamwork. If the nations work together, it's guaranteed that a solution will be formed, and the more "teammates" there are, the faster the answer will be found. The two nations doesn't have to be only the U.S. and Europe working to fight against terrorism. Nations all over the world can work together to eliminate the opposition. If this is accomplished, Federalist 8 will remain relevant for as long as we live.

In today's generation, federalist 8 remains steadfast. Knowing of wars being fought around the world, wars that have been fought in the past and wars of the future, it's satisfying to know that no war has to be fought alone. Federalist 8 speaks of why and how a union exists, and how it's used to protect territory against outside forces. However, it doesn't explicitly state that a Union should be only between states. Relationships kept between two or more countries will result in an absolute and secure future. Knowing that you're being protected by allies from different parts around the world, guarantees prosperity. One of the biggest issues regarding public safety, is the occurrence of terrorism around the world. Countless lives destroyed and wasted away in the West, along with terrorist attacks on both U.S. and European soil. This is reason enough to state that no war should be fought alone, and safeguarding a Union between two or more countries should remain as a priority.

In relation to the past, Federalist 8 was relevant just as much as it is today. When the World War I began, no one fought alone since the countries at war had their allies. America decided not to partake in the war, that is until the Germans decided to sink the Lusitania; an ocean liner that had American civilians on board. Once they declared war on Germany, America and her allies worked in unison to defeat those who meant harm against the two nations. The following was a prime example of how two or more countries to work each other to protect each other. During the time of World War II, the same course of actions took place. America decided not to "participate" in the war until the attack on Pearl Harbor. Once they entered the game, they "partnered" up with their allies to defeat a common enemy and to protect their people and home. These unions proved beneficial as both parties aided each other in completing a similar objective. United States in the past is another example, especially when it came to the thirteen colonies protecting each other by having each other's backs against any form of opposition, mostly referring to foreign threats, possibly Great Britain.

In conclusion, to guarantee the safety of America and the people, a proper Union must've been established and a group of individuals must've been gathered to uphold it. If one didn't exist of the two, the other would be defunct. Meaning, if the union didn't exist, then what's the purpose of owning an army if they have nothing to protect? Or if an army wasn't established, then what's the purpose of a Union if it can't be protected? Having both, assures the protection of the lives of the people that made America what it is today. The threat doesn't include Britain exclusively but attackers from different nations whose only means is to minimize our sense of security and/or to gain territory. In comparison to the modern world, Federalist 8 remains applicable given that there are those who seek to harm our land. Forming a relationship with the various countries around the world gives us the upper hand to fend off those who mean harm. The meaning behind the paper will remain the same since it applies to all conflicts that have been fought in the past, present, and conflicts of the future.

References

External links 

 Text of The Federalist No. 8: congress.gov

08
Federalist No. 08
1787 essays
1787 in the United States